The 2021–22 Dhaka Senior Division Football League also known as Bashundhara Group Senior Division Football League for sponsorship reasons or as First Division Football League, was the 6th season of the Dhaka Senior Division League since it was rebranded in 2007. A total of 14 teams were competed in the league.

Somaj Kallyan KS Mugda is the current trophy holder having won 2021–22 season title.

Venue
The opening ceremony and opening match was held at Bashundhara Kings Arena of Bashundhara Sports Complex, Dhaka.

The rest of the matches are being  played at Bir Sherestha Shaheed Shipahi Mostafa Kamal Stadium of Kamalapur, Dhaka.

Teams

Arambagh KS couldn't participate in this edition of the league as FIFA imposed a transfer-ban on the club while Dhaka City FC withdrew due to unknown reason.
PWD Sports Club
Jatrabari KC
Mohakhali Ekadosh
Badda Jagoroni Sangsad
Bangladesh Boys Club
Koshaituli Somaj Kollayan Parishad
Somaj Kallyan KS Mugda
East End Club
Dilkusha Sporting Club
Nobabpur Krira Chakra
Basabo Torun Shangha
Sadharan Bima Corporation Sporting Club
Friends Social Welfare Organization
Victoria Sporting Club

League table

Goalscorers

Unknown goalscrorers
Mohakhali Ekadosh 0–1 Basabo Torun Shangha match of 1 goal scorers player name unknown.
Dilkusha SC 0–4 PWD Sporting Club match of 4 goal scorers player name unknown.
Mohakhali Ekadosh 0–1 Jatrabari KC match of 1 goal scorers player name unknown.
Nobabpur KC 1–5 Jatrabari KC match of 1 goal scorers player of Nobabpur KC name unknown.
Dilkusha SC 0–1 Friends Social WO match of 1 goal scorer player name unknown.

See also
2021–22 Bangladesh Championship League
2021–22 Dhaka Second Division Football League

References

Dhaka League
2021 in Bangladeshi football
2020 in Bangladeshi football